Lava Beds National Monument is the site of the largest concentration of lava tubes in North America.

Lava Beds may also refer to:
Lava Beds, California, a former settlement in Butte County, California

See also
Lava Beds War or Modoc War, an armed conflict between the Modoc tribe and the U.S. Army in southern Oregon and northern California from 1872 to 1873